Suzanne M. Ness is a Democratic member of the Illinois House from the 66th district since January 13, 2021. The 66th district, located in the Chicago area, includes all or parts of Algonquin, Carpentersville, Crystal Lake, East Dundee, Elgin, Gilberts, Huntley, Lake in the Hills, Lakewood, Sleepy Hollow, and West Dundee.

Ness was elected to the 66th district after defeating Republican incumbent Allen Skillicorn.

Early life, education, and career
Ness graduated from Arizona State University with a Bachelor of Science in Communication Studies and a minor in Women's Studies. She graduated from the University of Phoenix with a Master of Arts in Organizational Management. She became a certified professional co-active coach from Coaches Training International in San Francisco. She works as a coach for Forward Effect and the owner of a small business. She has worked as an adjunct faculty member for Purdue University Global since 2010. In 2013, she founded the Living Forward Foundation. In 2018, she was elected as a member of the McHenry County Board.

As of July 3, 2022, Representative Ness is a member of the following Illinois House committees:

 Appropriations - General Service Committee (HAPG)
 Counties & Townships Committee (HCOT)
 Energy & Environment Committee (HENG)
 Human Services Committee (HHSV)
 Special Issues (HS) Subcommittee (HHSV-SPIS)
 State Government Administration Committee (HSGA)
 Transportation: Regulation, Roads & Bridges (HTRR)

Electoral history

Personal life
She has three children, a granddaughter, and "many nieces and nephews."

References

External links
Representative Suzanne Ness (D) at the Illinois General Assembly

21st-century American politicians
21st-century American women politicians
Arizona State University alumni
Living people
Democratic Party members of the Illinois House of Representatives
University of Phoenix alumni
Women state legislators in Illinois
Year of birth missing (living people)